The 1988 Sovran Bank Classic was a men's tennis tournament played on outdoor hard courts at the Rock Creek Park in Washington, D.C. in the United States that was part of the 1988 Nabisco Grand Prix. It was the 20th edition of the tournament was held from July 18 through July 24, 1988. First-seeded Jimmy Connors, who entered on a wildcard, won the singles title, his third at the event after 1976 and 1978.

Finals

Singles
 Jimmy Connors defeated  Andrés Gómez 6–1, 6–4
 It was Connors' first singles title of the year and the 106th of his career.

Doubles
 Rick Leach /  Jim Pugh defeated  Jorge Lozano /  Todd Witsken 6–3, 6–7, 6–2

References

External links
 ATP tournament profile
 ITF tournament edition details

1988 Grand Prix (tennis)
1988
1988 in sports in Washington, D.C.
1988 in American tennis